Barnhill is a surname of English origin.

People with the surname include
Dave Barnhill (1913–1983), US athlete in baseball
David Barnhill (b. 1969), Australian athlete in rugby
Herb Barnhill (1913-?), US athlete in baseball 
Hettie Vyrine Barnhill (fl. 2000s-present), US dancer, choreographer
James Barnhill (referee) (1921–1966), US sports figure
Joe Barnhill (b. 1965), US singer, songwriter
John Barnhill (American football) (1903–1973), US college football coach
John Barnhill (basketball) (1938–2013), US athlete in basketball
John Barnhill (politician) (1905–1971), Northern Ireland political figure
M.V. Barnhill (1887–1963), US attorney, judge
Margaret Barnhill (1799–1861), grandmother of US President Theodore Roosevelt
Norton Barnhill (b. 1953), US athlete in basketball
Ruby Barnhill (b. 2004), English actress
William A. Barnhill (1889–1987), US photographer

References